Llanafan (Welsh for "St Afan's parish") may refer to any of:

 Llanafan, Ceredigion, a village in Ceredigion
 Llanafan Fawr, a community and parish in Powys
 Llanafan Fechan of Llanfechan, a village and church in Powys
 Llanafan y Trawsgoed, the parish around the village in Ceredigion